Blagdon may refer to

in England
Blagdon, Paignton, a historic estate in Devon
Blagdon, a village in North Somerset
Blagdon, a village near Taunton, Somerset, now generally known as Blagdon Hill
Blagdon Hall, Northumberland

in New Zealand
Blagdon, New Zealand

See also
Blagden (disambiguation)